Fairfield Park may refer to:

Fairfield Park Precinct, or Fairfield Park, an urban park in western Sydney, Australia
Fairfield, Bedfordshire, England, a village that was originally known as Fairfield Park
Fairfield railway station, Melbourne, Australia, originally called Fairfield Park railway station